Salmacina is a genus of marine polychaete worms in the family Sabellidae. The type taxon is Salmacina incrustans Claparède, 1870.

Species
The following species are classified in this genus:
Salmacina amphidentata Jones, 1962
Salmacina australis Haswell, 1885
Salmacina ceciliae Nogueira & ten Hove, 2000
Salmacina dysteri (Huxley, 1855)
Salmacina huxleyi (Ehlers, 1887)
Salmacina incrustans Claparède, 1870
Salmacina piranga (Grube, 1872)
Salmacina setosa Langerhans, 1884
Salmacina tribranchiata (Moore, 1923)

References

Serpulidae